The 17th European Athletics Championships were held from 18 August to 23 August 1998 in Budapest, the capital city of Hungary.

Men's results

Track
1990 |1994 |1998 |2002 |2006 |

Field
1990 |1994 |1998 |2002 |2006 |

Women's results

Track
1990 |1994 |1998 |2002 |2006 |

Field
1990 |1994 |1998 |2002 |2006 |

Medal table

See also
1998 in athletics (track and field)

Notes
Differences to competition format since the 1994 European Championships

New events added:
Women's 5000 m replaces the 3000 m
Women's Pole Vault
Women's Hammer Throw

References
 Athletix

 
E
European Athletics Championships
International sports competitions in Budapest
European Athletics Championships
International athletics competitions hosted by Hungary
1998 in European sport
August 1998 sports events in Europe
1990s in Budapest